Đông Bắc (literally "Northeast" from ) is the region to the north of the Red River Delta in Vietnam, bordering China. It is called Northeast to distinguish it from the Tây Bắc or "Northwest", but it is actually in the north and northeast of Hanoi, wider than Việt Bắc or "Northern Vietnam". The Northeast is one of three sub-regions of Northern Vietnam (the other two sub-regions are the Northwest and the Red River Delta). Sometimes the Northeast includes the Red River Delta.

Geography

Location 
The Northeast region encompasses the provinces northeast of Hanoi, near the border with China. It has a population of about ten million.

Geographics 
Geographical boundaries to the west of the Northeast are not clear, mainly due to the lack of consensus about the geography of Vietnam on the boundary between the Northwest and Northeast to be the Red River or the Hoàng Liên Sơn. The Northeast is limited to the north and east by the Vietnam-China border, while the Southeast overlooks the Gulf of Tonkin. The southern limit is composed of the Tam Đảo mountain range and the Red River Delta.

It is also mountainous in the midlands, the mountainous include massifs, and limestone mountains.

The western side, is limited by the Red River valley and the Chảy River's source, above, is composed of granite, slate and limestone plateau. In essence, this is the edge of the Yunnan Plateau. The high mountains of the Northeast are concentrated here, as Tây Côn Lĩnh, Kiêu Liêu Ti.

The northern part junction with Vietnam-China border are the plateau (highland) turns from west to east are: Bắc Hà, Quản Bạ, Đồng Văn. Two first plateau has an average elevation of 1000-1200m. Đồng Văn Plateau is 1600m. Rivers and streams flowing through the plateau created long and deep canyons. There are also some small plains, like Thất Khê, Lạng Sơn, Lộc Bình, and Cao Bằng.

To the east, from the Gâm River's middle into the sea, which is lower than many mountains arc turned eastward turn from east to west is the Gâm River's anticline, Ngân Sơn-Yên Lạc Bow, Bắc Sơn Massif, Đông Triều Mountain range. Mountains rising above the sea form the famous scenery of Hạ Long. The arc of these mountains are mostly covered tail at Tam Đảo.

Southwest, from Phú Thọ, southern Tuyên Quang, southern Yên Bái and Thái Nguyên, lower toward the plain. It is called as the "midlands". The height of this section is about 100–150 m.

The Northeast has many rivers flow through, including the major river of the Red, Chảy, Lô, Gâm (the Red rivers system), Cầu, Thương, Lục Nam (in Thái Bình river system), Bằng, Bắc Giang, Kỳ Cùng...

Northeast's sea region has many large and small islands, nearly 2/3 the number of Vietnam's sea islands (including the Hoàng Sa and Trường Sa).

History 
During the multiple eras of Vietnam under Chinese rule, this region was often controlled by Chinese dynasties for almost a thousand years, beginning from the Han dynasty when they had conquered Nanyue. It left a legacy whereby this region is the most heavily sinicized in Vietnam. Even today, many cross-border changes occur with the contemporary People's Republic of China (PRC). Many of the individuals who live here have partial Chinese ancestry, and it is not uncommon for Chinese languages to be heard in this region, such as in cities like Lạng Sơn (谅山) and Móng Cái (芒街).

Provinces 

 The two provinces Lào Cai and Yên Bái are usually seen as part of the Northwest region.

Gallery

See also
Provinces of Vietnam

External links

 
Regions of Vietnam
Geography of Vietnam